S. Antonius Budi Ariantho (born 3 October 1973) is a retired Indonesian badminton player who specialized in men's doubles. During the 1990s he shared numerous international titles with his regular partner Denny Kantono including the French (1993); Hong Kong (1993); Denmark (1994); Thailand (1994); Chinese Taipei (1995, 1996); and Indonesia (1996) Opens; and the (now defunct) Badminton World Cup (1996) and World Badminton Grand Prix (1998) events. They were runners-up at the prestigious All-England Open in 1995, and bronze medalists at the 1996 Olympics in Atlanta.

1996 Olympics 
Ariantho competed in badminton at the 1996 Summer Olympics in men's doubles, with Denny Kantono, and won a bronze medal. They lost in semifinals against Cheah Soon Kit and Yap Kim Hock, of Malaysia, 15–10, 15–4, and in the bronze medal match they defeated Soo Beng Kiang and Tan Kim Her, of Malaysia, 15–4, 12–15, 15–8.

Achievements

Olympic Games 
Men's doubles

World Cup 
Men's doubles

Asian Championships 
Men's doubles

Asian Cup 
Men's doubles

Southeast Asian Games 
Men's doubles

IBF World Grand Prix 
The World Badminton Grand Prix sanctioned by International Badminton Federation (IBF) since 1983.

Men's doubles

IBF International 
Men's doubles

References 

 General

External links 
 
 

1973 births
Living people
People from Pekalongan
Sportspeople from Central Java
Indonesian male badminton players
Badminton players at the 1996 Summer Olympics
Olympic badminton players of Indonesia
Olympic bronze medalists for Indonesia
Olympic medalists in badminton
Medalists at the 1996 Summer Olympics
Competitors at the 1995 Southeast Asian Games
Southeast Asian Games gold medalists for Indonesia
Southeast Asian Games bronze medalists for Indonesia
Southeast Asian Games medalists in badminton
World No. 1 badminton players
20th-century Indonesian people